St. Croix Island is the largest of three islands in Algoa Bay, South Africa located within 8 kilometres of the Port of Nqgura. The islands are of critical importance to sea bird populations, including the endangered African penguin.

St. Croix Island 

It adds that the island is rocky and “supports minimal vegetation”. Its highest point is halfway along the north coast. Bartholomeu Dias planted a padrão and celebrated Mass on the island in March 1488. With 22,000 African penguins breeding on the island it is the largest breeding colony of this penguin species. Boat trips out of Port Elizabeth take tourists to see these birds. The population's modern history peaked in 1993, when 63,000 penguins lived there. The population is in decline, following the national and species' trend despite the best efforts of conservation group SANCCOB.

In 2019, the penguins of St. Croix island were impacted by an oil spill at the Port of Ngqura.

As of 2022 there has been no environmental impact assessment of the ship to shore bunkering with further spills leading to the collapse of the breading colonies.

Brenton Island 
It is named after Naval Commissioner Sir Jahleel Brenton.

Jahleel Island 
Jahleel is about the same size as Brenton and has a north-south axis.

References

Landforms of the Eastern Cape
Indian Ocean islands of South Africa